Angela Gotelli (25 February 1905 – 21 November 1996) was an Italian politician, educator and activist. She served in the Chamber of Deputies as a member of Christian Democracy.

The daughter of Domenico Gotelli, a doctor, and Tullia Fattori, she was born in San Quirico, part of Albareto. She attended high school in La Spezia and went on to study literature and philosophy at the University of Genoa. During her time in university, she was a member of the Italian Catholic Federation of University Students (FUCI). Gotelli become a close friend of the Blessed Itala Mela and knew personally the future Pope Paul VI. She was later named FUCI delegate for northeast Italy. After graduating, she taught school in Pontremoli and Trieste.

At the start of World War II, she took a course with the Red Cross in La Spezia and served in Brindisi. She later took care of the sick and wounded in Albareto. She took part in the drafting of the Codice di Camaldoli in July 1943. From 1943 to 1945, Gotelli participated in the Italian resistance movement. She was also involved in the exchange of hostages with the Germans.

She moved to Rome in 1945. From 1946 to 1950, she served as national delegate for the Movimento femminile cattolico (Catholic women's movement).  In 1950, she joined the "Porcellino" group, a left-wing Christian group. Gotelli was elected to the Constituent Assembly of Italy in 1946. She was elected to the Italian Chamber of Deputies in 1948, 1953 and 1958, serving as undersecretary of Health. She was forced to withdraw from political activities during the early 1970s for health reasons.

She served as mayor of Albareto from 1951 to 1958.

Gotelli died in Albareto at the age of 91.

References 

1905 births
1996 deaths
University of Genoa alumni
Italian resistance movement members
Christian Democracy (Italy) politicians
Members of the Constituent Assembly of Italy
Deputies of Legislature I of Italy
Deputies of Legislature II of Italy
Deputies of Legislature III of Italy
Women mayors of places in Italy
20th-century Italian women politicians
Women members of the Chamber of Deputies (Italy)